Lars-Erik Esbjörs (born October 11, 1949 in Avesta, Sweden) is a retired Swedish professional ice hockey player and coach.

He is the father of ice hockey players Joacim and Jonas Esbjörs.

References

1949 births
Frölunda HC players
Living people
Swedish ice hockey defencemen
Swedish ice hockey coaches